The Cascos government was the regional government of Asturias led by President Francisco Álvarez Cascos. It was formed in July 2011 after the regional election.

After six months of minority government and being his regional budget for 2012 was rejected. This blocked situation forced him to resign on 30 January 2012, called for new elections to be held on 25 March, thus ending the shortest legislature in the General Junta ever.

Investiture

Council of Government

References

2011 in Asturias
Cabinets of Asturias
Cabinets established in 2011
Cabinets disestablished in 2012
2011 establishments in Spain